Ash Mountain is a mountain located in Park County, Montana, USA.

Notes

External links
 

Mountains of Montana
Mountains of Park County, Montana